Alexander Neumüller (born 2 March 1966) is an Austrian wrestler. He competed in the men's Greco-Roman 130 kg at the 1988 Summer Olympics.

References

1966 births
Living people
Austrian male sport wrestlers
Olympic wrestlers of Austria
Wrestlers at the 1988 Summer Olympics
Sportspeople from Salzburg